Gazeta de Santafé de Bogotá was a Spanish language newspaper .It was first published in 1785.

References

Newspapers established in 1785
Spanish-language newspapers